Warren A. Marrison (21 May 1896 – 27 March 1980) was a Canadian engineer and inventor. Marrison was the co-inventor of the first Quartz clock in 1927.

Early life and education
Marrison was born in Inverary, Frontenac county, Ontario. He studied at Queen's University in Kingston, Ontario, where he was part of a new program in engineering physics. He graduated in 1920 with a bachelor's degree in physics engineering; his studies were interrupted by World War I when he served in the Royal Flying Corps as a radio technician.

Beginning in 1921, he studied at Harvard University, ultimately receiving a master's degree.  He worked at first for Western Electric in New York City, but moved to Bell Laboratories in New York beginning in 1925.

Quartz clock
At Bell Labs in New York, Marrison was working on frequency standards using quartz as a reference. It was in 1927 that he developed the first quartz clock while working with J.W. Horton. The clock used a block of crystal, stimulated by electricity, to produce pulses at a frequency of 50,000 cycles per second. A submultiple controlled frequency generator then divided this down to a usable, regular pulse that drove a synchronous motor. While this first version of the clock was crude; Morrison produced a more refined version in 1928. A New York Times headline in October 1929 reported "Electrified Quartz Crystal Displaces Clock Pendulum".

Legacy and awards
The invention would lead AT&T, the subsequent owners of Bell Labs, to develop a timepiece division called Frequency Control Products. This would eventually become the company Vectron International.

In 1947 Marrison was awarded a Gold Medal from the British Horological Institute. In 1955 the Clockmakers Company awarded him the Tompion Medal.

In 2011 Marrison was inducted into the Inventor's Hall of Fame.

References 

1896 births
1980 deaths
Canadian inventors
People from Frontenac County
Queen's University at Kingston alumni
Harvard University alumni
Bell Labs
Canadian engineers